Lathyrus sativus, also known as grass pea, cicerchia, blue sweet pea, chickling pea, chickling vetch, Indian pea, white pea and white vetch, is a legume (family Fabaceae) commonly grown for human consumption and livestock feed in Asia and East Africa. It is a particularly important crop in areas that are prone to drought and famine, and is thought of as an 'insurance crop' as it produces reliable yields when all other crops fail. The Serra de'Conti Cicerchia is included in the Ark of Taste. 

The seeds contain a neurotoxin that causes lathyrism, a neurodegenerative disease, if eaten as a primary protein source for a prolonged period.

Cultivation
Like other legumes, it improves the nitrogen content of soil. The crop can survive drought or floods, but grows best in moist soils. It tolerates a range of soil types from light sandy through loamy to heavy clay, and acid, neutral, or alkaline soils. It does not tolerate shade.

Slow Food inducted Serra de'Conti Cicerchia, a cicerchia grown in Serra de’ Conti Municipality, Ancona Province, Marche region of Italy into the Ark of Taste.

Uses

Seed is sold for human consumption at markets in Florence. Consumption of this pulse in Italy is limited to some areas in the central part of the country, and is steadily declining.

Flour made from grass peas (Spanish: almorta) is the main ingredient for the gachas manchegas or gachas de almorta. Accompaniments for the dish vary throughout La Mancha. This is an ancient Manchego cuisine staple, generally consumed during the cold winter months. The dish is generally eaten directly out of the pan in which  it was cooked, using either a spoon or a simple slice of bread. This dish is commonly consumed immediately after removing it from the fire, being careful not to burn one's lips or tongue.

Due to its toxicity, its human consumption was forbidden in Spain from 1967 to 2018. However, it was widely distributed as animal feed and displayed away from other flours valid for human consumption (BOE-2484/1967. September 21st. Paragraphs 3.18.09 a and b and 5.36.16 b)

The town of Alvaiázere in Portugal dedicates a festival lasting several days to dishes featuring the pulse. Alvaiázere calls itself the Chícharo capital, the name of this pulse in Portuguese.

Immature seeds can be eaten like green peas. L. sativus needs soaking and thorough cooking to reduce toxins.

The leaves and stem are cooked and eaten as chana saga (Odia: ଚଣା ଶାଗ) in parts of Odisha, India.

Seed ODAP characteristics

Like other grain legumes, L. sativus produces a high-protein seed. The seeds however also contain variable amounts of a neurotoxic amino acid β-N-oxalyl-L-α,β-diaminopropionic acid (ODAP). ODAP is considered the cause of the disease neurolathyrism, a neurodegenerative disease that causes paralysis of the lower body: emaciation of gluteal muscle (buttocks). The disease has been seen to occur after famines in Europe (France, Spain, Germany), North Africa, and South Asia, and is still prevalent in Eritrea, Ethiopia, and Afghanistan (panhandle) when Lathyrus seed is the exclusive or main source of nutrients for extended periods. ODAP concentration increases in plants grown under stressful conditions, compounding the problem.
Some authors have argued that this toxicity is overstated, and L. sativus is harmless as part of a normal diet. This legume is the only known dietary source for L-homoarginine and is preferred over arginine for nitric oxide (NO) generation. L-ODAP is reported to act as an activator of calcium-dependent protein kinase C.

Breeding programs
Breeding programs are underway to produce lines of L. sativus that produce less ODAP. 
Crop wild relatives are prominent source of genetic material, which can be tapped to improve cultivars. ICARDA is currently evaluating crop wild relatives to explore the genes with low or no ODAP and resistant/tolerant to biotic/abiotic stresses and transfer them to cultivated grass pea.

See also
Kinako

References

External links

IPBO Lathyrus Research Laboratory
Lathyrus newsletter

sativus
Flora of Asia
Edible legumes
Medicinal plants
Castilian-La Mancha cuisine
Plants described in 1753
Taxa named by Carl Linnaeus